Libertad me das (Spanish for "Freedom you give me") is a 1998 full-length Spanish language album by Christian singer Sandi Patty. The title song is also the Spanish version of her Artist of My Soul track "You Set Me Free." The album consists of some choice songs sung in Spanish from her Word catalog and is co-produced by Patty's long-time producer Greg Nelson with Spanish translation arrangements by Isaac Hernandez. Libertad me das won at the 30th GMA Dove Awards for Spanish Language Album of the Year in a tie along with Crystal Lewis' Oro (her Spanish language album version of Gold).

Track listing

Accolades 
GMA Dove Awards

References

1998 albums
Sandi Patty albums
Word Records albums